Firebolt may refer to:

Starfire Firebolt, an American homebuilt aerobatic biplane
USS Firebolt (PC-10), a United States Navy coastal patrol boat
AQM-81A Firebolt, a target drone of the United States
Firebolt (Harry Potter), a flying broomstick in the fictional Harry Potter universe game of Quidditch
Buell XB9R Firebolt and Buell XB12R Firebolt sportbikes

See also
Flamethrower, a ranged incendiary device designed to project a controllable jet of fire